Ciri or CIRI may refer to:

Centre International de Recherche en Infectiologie, an academic and research institute based in Lyon, France.
CIRI Human Rights Data Project
Cook Inlet Region, Inc.
Continuous Individualized Risk Index
An alternate name for Tiri language of New Caledonia
CIRI-FM, a traffic advisory radio station, Calgary, Alberta, Canada
Cirilla, a female protagonist from the fantasy saga The Witcher by Andrzej Sapkowski
Ciri, an episode of The Hexer (TV series), based on Sapkowski's saga
Ciri, a nickname of Ciriaco Sforza, a Swiss former professional football player